Saint-Marcouf is the name of several places in Normandy, France:

Saint Marcouf, Calvados, in the Calvados department
Saint-Marcouf, Manche, in the Manche department
Îles Saint-Marcouf, a group of islands off the coast of the Cotentin Peninsula

See also
 Saint Marcouf